"And When I Die" is a song written by American singer and songwriter Laura Nyro. It was first recorded by the folk group Peter, Paul and Mary in 1966. Nyro released her own version on her debut album More Than a New Discovery in February 1967.

The song is best known for the next version, recorded by the jazz-rock group Blood, Sweat & Tears in late 1968. This recording reached No. 2 on the US Billboard Hot 100 and became a Gold record. In the US, it was kept from #1 by the double A-side "Come Together"/"Something" by The Beatles. "And When I Die" also reached No. 1 in Canada in December 1969 after 3 weeks at No. 2 also due to The Beatles.

Lyrics
The song gives a positive outlook about death, stating, in the chorus, "And when I die / and when I'm gone / there'll be one child born, in this world / to carry on / to carry on."

History
"And When I Die" was one of the first songs recorded by Nyro, when she was 17 years old. She then sold the song to folk group Peter, Paul and Mary for $5000, who then recorded the song for their sixth studio album The Peter, Paul and Mary Album.

The song appeared on the self-titled second album by Blood, Sweat & Tears. It was the third single from the album, peaking at #2 on the Billboard Hot 100; the album's previous two singles had also stalled at #2 on the same chart.

The BS&T arrangement is very different from previous versions. It was also released as an album version and an edited single version. The album version features two instrumental portions, one featuring an RMI Electra Piano, and the other featuring horns and temple blocks, like a western cowboy song. Also, the pauses between the choruses and the other two verses are longer than on the edited version.

Chart history

Year-end Charts

Other versions
The song was also recorded by The Heavy. This version was used in the season four finale of True Blood. 
The song was also played by Joe 90 in the horror movie Final Destination (2000).
Billy Childs and Alison Krauss contributed a version of the song for Childs's 2014 album Map to the Treasure: Reimagining Laura Nyro. Childs and Krauss received nominations for the Grammy Award for Best American Roots Performance for their version.

Popular culture
A line from the song is sung at the end of season one, episode three in the 2016 series Van Helsing when Doc, played by Rukiya Bernard, is healed and returned from a feral - zombie - state to a human state.

References

External links
  singing the song in concert in 1976
  singing the song in Pittsburgh in 1994
  sing the song at the Sydney Opera House in 1970
 , used for the True Blood season 4 finale

1966 songs
1969 singles
American soul songs
Blood, Sweat & Tears songs
Peter, Paul and Mary songs
Laura Nyro songs
Songs written by Laura Nyro
Song recordings produced by James William Guercio
Columbia Records singles
Songs about death
Cashbox number-one singles
RPM Top Singles number-one singles
Number-one singles in New Zealand